The Minister for Nordic Cooperation (Swedish: Minister för nordiskt samarbete) is a cabinet minister within the Swedish Government and appointed by the Prime Minister of Sweden.

The minister is responsible for issues regarding Nordic affairs. The current minister Jessika Roswall is also responsible for Sweden's EU Affairs.

List of Ministers for Nordic Cooperation

See also 
 Minister for Nordic Cooperation (Denmark)
 Minister for Nordic Cooperation (Finland)
 Minister for Nordic Cooperation (Iceland)

References

Government ministers of Sweden
Nordic politics